Nathan Andrew Orf (born February 1, 1990) is an American former professional baseball infielder. He played in Major League Baseball (MLB) for the Milwaukee Brewers in 2018 and Oakland Athletics in 2020.

Career
Orf played college baseball at the University of Illinois at Chicago for two seasons and then transferred to Baylor University for his final two seasons.

Milwaukee Brewers
He was signed as an undrafted free agent by the Milwaukee Brewers in 2013.

On August 31, 2014, when he was playing for the Brevard County Manatees, Orf played all nine positions in a game against the Dunedin Blue Jays. He became the first Manatee to ever play all nine positions. The next day, on September 1, Orf was called up to the Huntsville Stars for the playoffs. The Brewers promoted him to the major leagues on July 2, 2018. Orf's first major league hit, a home run, came on July 4 at home against the Minnesota Twins pitcher José Berríos. After the home run, Orf was carried out of the dugout by his teammates for a curtain call. He was outrighted off the major league roster on August 31.   

He was assigned to San Antonio Missions for the 2019 season. He elected free agency following the 2019 season.

Oakland Athletics
On November 25, 2019, Orf signed a minor league contract, with an invite to major league spring training, with the Oakland Athletics. On September 13, 2020, Orf was selected to the major league roster. On February 16, 2021, Orf retired from professional baseball.

References

External links

1990 births
Living people
People from Wentzville, Missouri
Baseball players from Missouri
Major League Baseball infielders
Milwaukee Brewers players
Oakland Athletics players
UIC Flames baseball players
Baylor Bears baseball players
Helena Brewers players
Brevard County Manatees players
Biloxi Shuckers players
Surprise Saguaros players
Colorado Springs Sky Sox players
San Antonio Missions players
Tiburones de La Guaira players
American expatriate baseball players in Venezuela
Leones del Escogido players
American expatriate baseball players in the Dominican Republic
Eau Claire Express players